Kozara is a 1962 Yugoslav film directed by Veljko Bulajić. It is a well known film of the partisan film subgenre popular in Yugoslavia in the 1960s and 1970s and depicts events surrounding the Battle of Kozara.

It won the Big Golden Arena for Best Film at the 1962 Pula Film Festival, the Yugoslav national film awards, was entered into the 3rd Moscow International Film Festival where it won a Golden Prize, and was selected as the Yugoslav entry for the Best Foreign Language Film at the 32nd Academy Awards, but was not accepted as a nominee.

Cast
 Bert Sotlar as Vuksa
 Velimir 'Bata' Živojinović as Sorga (as Bata Zivojinovic)
 Milena Dravić as Milja
 Olivera Marković as Andja
 Dragomir Felba as Obrad
 Ljubiša Samardžić as Mitar
 Mihajlo Kostić-Pljaka as Ahmet (as Mihajlo Kostić)
  as Ivica
 Abdurrahman Shala as Jakov (as Abdurahman Salja)
 Davor Antolić as Joja
 Tana Mascarelli as Marinko's mother (as Tana Maskareli)
 Tamara Miletić as Zlata
 Adam Vedernjak as Marinko

See also
 List of submissions to the 36th Academy Awards for Best Foreign Language Film
 List of Yugoslav submissions for the Academy Award for Best Foreign Language Film

References

External links

Kozara at Filmski-Programi.hr 

1962 films
1962 drama films
Serbo-Croatian-language films
Films directed by Veljko Bulajić
Partisan films
Yugoslav black-and-white films
World War II films based on actual events